Maitland, East Hants, Nova Scotia (originally known as Jean Peter's Village) is a village in East Hants, Nova Scotia. It is home to the historic Lawrence House Museum, which is part of the Nova Scotia Museum. The community was part of the Douglas Township until it was named Maitland after Governor General of Nova Scotia Peregrine Maitland (1828–34) when building the Shubenacadie Canal was first attempted (1826–1831). The Canal was supposed to start at Maitland, Nova Scotia and run through the province to Maitland Street, Dartmouth, the canal being "bookended" by two "Maitland" landmarks.

History
Maitland was first settled by the Acadians. After the Acadian expulsion from the region (1750), the village was eventually settled by Ulster Scots whose descendants became shipbuilders.

Acadians

Maitland was settled by Jean Pitre (i.e., Peters), son of Jean Denis Pitre, prior to the Acadian Expulsion. Oral tradition states that the Oak Island Graveyard was an Acadian burial ground, which was consecrated by Abbe Jean-Louis Le Loutre.  Oral tradition also states that a path that connects the "French Field" in Selma to the cemetery in Maitland is the old Acadian roadway.

Several of Jean Denis Pitre's children married the children of Noel Doiron and Robert Henry from the neighbouring communities of Vil Noel (Noel, Nova Scotia) and Vil Robere respectively. In 1750 the Acadians at Maitland joined the Acadian Exodus during Father Le Loutre's War and moved to Riviere Nord-Est, Ile St. Jean (present-day Hillsborough River (Prince Edward Island)).  The former inhabitants of Maitland died in 1758 during the Expulsion of the Acadians in the sinking of the Duke William.

Ulster Scots (Irish)

After the expulsion of the Acadians from Maitland (1750), the land was owned but never settled by Malachy Salter. Decades after the village was vacated by the Acadians, it was settled by Ulster Scots people such as the Putnams (c. 1771).

Shipbuilding
Maitland emerged as a major shipbuilding centre in the late 19th century. William Dawson Lawrence became the community's most famous shipbuilder. His ship, the William D. Lawrence, the largest wooden ship ever built in Canada and third largest in the world, was launched at the William D. Lawrence Shipyard in Maitland on October 27, 1874, to one of the largest crowds assembled in Nova Scotia to that date.
 Every September, Maitland celebrates the launch of William D. Lawrence at a weekend festival called "Launch Days". Several other shipyards built large vessels as well, including the barque Calburga, the last large square rigger to sail under the Canadian flag. Today, the only remaining remnant of the shipbuilding industry is Frieze and Roy, a general store which has operated since the 1860s and is known as Canada's oldest general store.

RCAF Aerodrome Maitland
During World War II, the RCAF constructed an aerodrome near the village of Maitland. The Aerodrome acted as a relief landing field for CFS Debert that was located nearby. 
The field was listed as "Hard under construction" and had one runway listed as follows:

Architecture

Maitland was Nova Scotia's first Heritage Conservation District. The centre of the village is a Heritage Conservation District because of its many fine and well-preserved examples of Victorian architecture. The styles of architecture include Gothic, Federal, Colonial, Cape Cod (house), Greek Revival architecture, Second Empire (architecture) and Italianate, of which style the Lawrence House shows many fine details.

Notable people
 William Dawson Lawrence, ship builder
 Willard Miller, Spanish–American War hero; recipient of the Medal of Honor

Film 
The story for the television drama "The Night They Killed Joe Howe" (1960) (TV drama), starring Douglas Rain, Austin Willis and Star Trek's James Doohan, was located in Maitland, Nova Scotia  ( Film Review)

References

Communities in Hants County, Nova Scotia
General Service Areas in Nova Scotia